Coenonympha rhodopensis (eastern large heath) is a butterfly of the family Nymphalidae. It is
found in Italy, Romania, Bulgaria, Albania, northern Greece, Serbia and Montenegro.

External links
Leps It
Butterflies of Bulgaria

Coenonympha
Butterflies of Europe
Butterflies described in 1900